In AFC Asian Cup, Prior to 2004, balls using for the tournament were various, and therefore it made hard to decide which balls were official balls for the Asian Cup. Only after going to new millennia, the AFC had started to choose an official ball. The following balls were used in the AFC Asian Cup over the years:

See also
 List of FIFA World Cup official match balls
 List of UEFA European Championship official match balls
 List of Copa América official match balls
 List of Africa Cup of Nations official match balls
 List of Olympic Football official match balls

References

External links